Slave of Desire (originally titled The Magic Skin) is a 1923 American silent drama film directed by George D. Baker, produced and distributed by Goldwyn Pictures. It was based on the novel La Peau de chagrin by Honoré de Balzac, first published in 1831. The Balzac novel had previously been filmed in 1909 as The Wild Ass's Skin, which was more faithful to the original novel.

The picture stars George Walsh, Bessie Love, and Carmel Myers. A print of the film is preserved in the collection of Cinémathèque Française.

Plot 
In Paris, when failed poet Raphael, Marquis de Valentin (Walsh) meets the glamorous Countess Fedora (Myers), who promotes Raphael as a poet. He falls in love with her, but she rejects him.

When he is about to commit suicide by jumping into the Seine, Raphael enters an antique shop where he gets a magic piece of leather that can grant wishes. As it grants wishes, the leather becomes smaller. Raphael selfishly uses the wishes for himself, but uses the final wish benevolently, which enables him to be reunited with his true love, Pauline (Love). Countess Fedora is buried under an avalanche.

Cast

Reception 

The film received mixed reviews, with many reviewers noted the fanciful plot and subject matter as a hindrance to the film's success.

Carmel Myers's performance was especially highly praised, as were the visuals, especially Myers's wardrobe.

References 
Notes

Citations

External links 

 
 
 
 Lobby card
 Stills at silenthollywood.com

1923 drama films
1923 films
American black-and-white films
Silent American drama films
American silent feature films
Films based on French novels
Films based on works by Honoré de Balzac
Films directed by George D. Baker
Films set in Paris
Surviving American silent films
1920s American films